Anne Marie Paulsen (born August 8, 1936 in Boston, Massachusetts) is an American Democratic Party (United States) politician from Belmont, Massachusetts. Paulsen served from 1993 to 2006.

Career
She represented the Massachusetts House of Representatives' 26th Middlesex district in the Massachusetts House of Representatives from 1993 to 2002. She later represented the Massachusetts House of Representatives' 24th Middlesex district in the Massachusetts House of Representatives from 2003 to 2007. Later she served as Democratic Party State Committee Woman.

See also
 1993–1994 Massachusetts legislature
 1995–1996 Massachusetts legislature
 1997–1998 Massachusetts legislature
 1999–2000 Massachusetts legislature
 2001–2002 Massachusetts legislature
 2003–2004 Massachusetts legislature
 2005–2006 Massachusetts legislature

References

External links 
Anne M. Paulsen, Sherry H. Penney and Elizabeth Sherman at an event celebrating its establishment 
Center for Women in Politics and Public Policy at University of Massachusetts Boston, Joseph P. Healey Library

Members of the Massachusetts House of Representatives
Women state legislators in Massachusetts
20th-century American women politicians
20th-century American politicians
People from Belmont, Massachusetts
1936 births
Living people
21st-century American women